Rocky Boy Public Schools is an elementary, junior high and high school with grades K through 12 on the Rocky Boy Indian Reservation located in Hill County, Montana, USA.

As of 2014 the student body is 99% Native American and 1% of other ethnicity.

Clubs
Clubs in the High School as of September 19, 2014:

 Indian Club
 FCCLA
 National Honor Society
 Student Council
 AISES
 Close-Up
 BPA/AIBL
 Galaxy (yearbook)
 Star Express (newspaper)
 Web Design
 Chess Club

See also 
 List of high schools in Montana
 Rocky Boy Indian Reservation

References

External links
 Official website

Schools in Hill County, Montana
Public high schools in Montana
Public middle schools in Montana